The Carver is a fictional character on the television show Nip/Tuck. Introduced during the second season, he became the primary antagonist of the third season.

Background 
The Carver is introduced in the episode "Naomi Gaines" as a masked serial rapist who disfigures, and rapes his victims; he has also killed one victim: Rhea Reynolds, a woman who faked being attacked by the Carver so she could get free plastic surgery. He becomes upset after Dr. Sean McNamara (Dylan Walsh) performs corrective plastic surgery on one of his victims.  He attacks McNamara in his bathroom and cuts one side of his face. He then threatens to kill McNamara if he "fixes" any more of the Carver's "masterpieces". McNamara continues to do so, and in the second-season cliffhanger, the Carver exacts revenge by attacking and raping Dr. Christian Troy (Julian McMahon), McNamara's associate. Before raping his victims, and/or carving their cheeks down to the lip to resemble a smile (a "Glasgow smile"), the Carver tells his victims, "Beauty is a curse on the world," sometimes adding, "It keeps us from seeing who the real monsters are."

Motives 
The Carver apparently believes that physical beauty is evil and feels compelled to destroy it.  He has referred to beauty as a type of prison or cage that people are trapped in and believes it necessary to free such a craftsman's pride in his or her work. He also considers his resulting disfigurements "art" – a new kind of beauty to grace the world.

Victims of the carver
Two unknown victims prior to episode "Naomi Gaines"
Naomi Gaines (2.07 Naomi Gaines)
Mr Rourke (2.15 Sean McNamara)
Unknown female victim (2.15 Sean McNamara)
Sean McNamara (2.15 Sean McNamara)
Christian Troy (2.16 Joan Rivers)
Rhea Reynolds (3.04 Rhea Reynolds- attacked)
Kit McGraw (3.05 Granville Trapp)
Kimber Henry
Nine sorority girls (3.15 Quentin Costa)
Quentin Costa (3.15 Quentin Costa) performed by Kit McGraw
Gina Russo (3.15 Quentin Costa)

Quentin Costa

Dr. Quentin Costa, portrayed by Bruno Campos, is ultimately revealed as Carver.

Quentin Costa is introduced in the episode "Sean McNamara" as a plastic surgeon from Atlanta, Georgia. He is brought in to assist Christian Troy in fixing Sean McNamara's face (a slash to the right side of his face) after an attack by The Carver, a masked serial rapist preying on individuals who would ultimately become Sean and Christian's patients.

In the third season, Sean offers Quentin a limited partnership after Christian neglects to return to work after being attacked by the Carver. Initially, Christian refuses to accept having Quentin as an associate, but later changes his mind and supports the decision. A couple of episodes later, he and Sean go to a frat party together. They end up receiving fellatio from two college girls, during which Costa winks at Sean. This bothers Sean and he leaves the room. In the same episode Christian asks Costa to help take Kit McGraw (Rhona Mitra) off his hands because he is tired of the three-way relationship with her and Kimber Henry (Kelly Carlson). While in bed with Kit on one side and Christian and Kimber on the other he reaches over and touches Christian's buttocks. Costa later explains that he is bisexual, and assumed Christian was as well. After Sean briefly leaves the practice, Costa remains to assist Christian with surgeries. Later Christian believes that Costa is on drugs and calls Sean to assist with the facial transplant surgery they are working on. Sean later returns to the practice.

Following Sean's return to the practice, both Costa and Sean admit their hatred for each other after the former enters a relationship with Sean's ex-wife Julia (Joely Richardson). After catching Costa having sex with a married male patient (a corporal), Sean blackmails him in an attempt to force him to quit the practice. Costa allows McNamara/Troy to buy out the rest of his contract at half price, only to then reveal he is staying in Miami to become the resident plastic surgeon at De La Mer, under the employment of Julia McNamara. He is later fired after an argument with Julia.

When Julia discovers she is pregnant, Sean and Christian suspect that Costa is the father. This is later proven false, as Costa (never knowing Julia was pregnant) admits to Christian that they never had sex. The child is now assumed to be Sean's.

At the end of episode 3.14 ("Cherry Peck"), it is revealed that Costa does not have a penis. Early in the next episode he attributes this to a genetic disorder known as 5-alpha-reductase deficiency that he suffers as a product of incest.

Unmasking 

The third season's finale (Episode 3.15, "Quentin Costa") revealed the Carver to be Quentin Costa, with assistance from his sister, Kit McGraw.

Exegesis: Summary of Episode 3.15 

Detective Kit McGraw brings Dr. Quentin Costa in for questioning, suspecting him to be the Carver; she subsequently finds that, due to a medical condition, Costa was born with no penis.  Since all of the Carver's victims were raped, Costa is released.

The Carver attacks a group of nine sorority girls. During questioning, one victim recounts walking in on the Carver raping her sorority sister, and was able to see that the Carver did not have a real penis, but rather was wearing a strap-on dildo.

Kit and the police storm Costa's apartment only to find Costa tied to his bed, bearing the trademark cheek slashes of The Carver, and the message "I can't stop" written in blood on the wall behind him.

Once again exonerated from the suspect pool, Costa asks Christian and Sean to repair his face. After initially refusing, Christian and Sean agree to perform the surgery. During this conversation, Costa explains away some potential plot holes from earlier in the season.  Specifically:

 When Sean witnessed Costa receiving oral sex at a college party, Costa explains how he paid the girl $100 to pretend to perform fellatio on him.
 When Costa was beginning to have 4-way sex with Christian, Kit and Kimber, he intentionally grabbed Christian's buttocks so he could end the session early and thus retain his secret.

During Costa's operation, Kit arrives with a S.W.A.T. team and arrests Liz Cruz (Roma Maffia), McNamara/Troy's anesthesiologist, as the next prime suspect. During the interrogation, Kit explains the evidence against Liz:
 A search warrant of Liz's house led to the discovery of a strap-on dildo.
 A receipt for an order of the same drugs the Carver uses on his victims was found at McNamara/Troy with Liz's signature on it.
 Liz has been visiting numerous area sperm banks and therefore could have obtained Christian's sperm and planted evidence that led to Christian's arrest as a suspect earlier in the season (it is known by the viewers that Liz received a sample directly from Christian in Season 2, but not mentioned by Kit). Liz attests her innocence during questioning.

Sean checks up on Quentin in recovery. Gina, carved but not dead, is the body in Quentin's bed — seen only by the audience. The Carver suddenly appears behind Sean, injects him with the paralyzing agent and unmasks — revealing himself to be none other than Quentin Costa.

Sean awakens to find both Christian and himself tied to separate operating tables. Costa cuts off Sean's pinky finger and attempts to force Christian to cut off his own hand. Just before Christian is about to do it, Kit arrives and shoots Costa in the back.  Kit tells paramedics to make sure the autopsy on Costa's body is not started without her.

At police headquarters, Kit explains to Christian and Sean that Gina (who was at the office to drop off a Christmas gift for Christian) called 9-1-1, which is why Kit showed up.  Kit then explains Quentin's life story.

Costa was born with 5-alpha-reductase deficiency, a debilitating disease that left him with no penis. He also had a sister, Violet, who suffered severe facial disfigurement. Apparently both medical anomalies were a result of incest. After their parents abandoned them, the two lived in a convent in Maine.  Quentin worked his whole life to become a plastic surgeon so he could fix his sister's face, but she died at the age of 29 during her final operation.

Kit leaves Miami after closing the case. While talking to Gina, Sean and Christian discover that Gina never called 911, as she was completely paralyzed after being attacked by the Carver.

In the morgue, we see a body laid out covered by a sheet. A hand removes the sheet to reveal Quentin Costa, who opens his eyes and sits up, revealing a bullet-proof vest beneath his black suit. "What took so long?" asks Costa.

Christian and Sean take a Red-eye flight to Maine to visit the convent where Costa was raised. When they mention Violet's death, the Mother Superior is confused, explaining that Quentin's sister's name isn't Violet, it is Katherine; but Quentin always called her Kit. The Mother Superior then shows Sean and Christian a Christmas card that the pair sent her three years before, which includes a photo of Quentin and Kit.

The Carver storyline ends with Quentin and Kit relaxing at a luxury hotel in Málaga. Although Kit wants to take a brief vacation, Quentin is spurred on by the sight of a woman with breast implants. The scene ends with a shot of the woman lying in a deck chair with Quentin and Kit's shadows hovering over her.

Correct guesses and a premature reveal

Prior to the finale, a few fans were able to correctly guess the identity of the Carver through the use of sound-editing programs.  As a promotion for the show, FX set up a profile for the Carver on myspace.com, which included videos of the Carver espousing his philosophy.  Within days, various tech-savvy audiophiles took the audio from these videos, filtered out the distortion from the Carver's voice synthesizer, and were able to reveal that at the very least, Campos was voicing The Carver.

The Carver's identity was also leaked prematurely by FX Networks itself. One day before the finale episode aired, the press section of the FX Networks website published three pictures which revealed the identity of the Carver. While the pictures were removed from the site later that evening, they had already been re-published on various fan-based message boards.

Behind the scenes

The Carver's outfit is made by Prada. His top is a black zip-up sweater from the Winter 2004 collection.
 Three knives were used for filming: A sharp, shiny one used for scenes in which the Carver is just brandishing the knife; a dull one for when the Carver "slashes"; and a dull one with a built in blood tube to create a bleeding effect when the knife is pressed against skin (this prop was used in the Season 2 episode in which Sean is carved).
 There was only one Carver mask, custom molded from porcelain and resin. Because it was so fragile, a props manager was in charge of making sure it was handled properly every time it was on the set.
 Bruno Campos wore brown contact lenses when playing the Carver to keep his blue eyes from being seen in the mask.
 Joely Richardson lost a $100 bet to Campos over the Carver's identity. Apparently, she couldn't believe it would be him.  He claims to have framed the cheque.

Real-life similarities
The Carver's modus operandi is somewhat similar to the urban legend of the Smiley Gang, a group of six men who offered their victims the choice of being raped or having an "eternal smile" cut into their faces. This hoax, predominantly spread by email, spread fear among teens and their parents in both the Netherlands and Belgium in late 2003. The key difference is that the Carver offered his victims no choice; he both cut and raped them.

See also

Notes
 Entertainment Weekly.  September 16, 2005
 ABC Local

References

Nip/Tuck characters
Television characters introduced in 2004
Fictional characters from Atlanta
Fictional characters involved in incest
Fictional characters with alter egos
Fictional characters with disabilities
Fictional murderers
Fictional rapists
Fictional intersex characters
Fictional LGBT characters in television
Fictional bisexual males
Fictional plastic surgeons
Fictional offspring of incestuous relationships
LGBT villains